Manent-Montané is a commune in the Gers department in southwestern France.

Geography

Population

References

Communes of Gers